Jacqueline Goldfinger (she/they) is an American playwright, librettist, and dramaturg who is known for her plays Bottle Fly, Babel, and Arsonist. She grew up in rural North Florida with a love of music and storytelling. Today, she is a playwright-librettist who seeks out unique collaborations, working across disciplines to create singular works of theater and opera. She works nationally and internationally on performative texts which speak to our shared humanity while honoring the nuanced identities of each character and culture.

She also teaches, mentors, and is the Director of Creative Affairs for the Sledgehammer imprint of Tripwire Harlot Press which publishes plays and play anthologies by under recognized playwrights.

Career

Writing for the stage 
Goldfinger began her career in fringe theater in 2007 by creating site-specific work with the San Diego Playwrights Collective and touring a one-act version of The Terrible Girls to the New York International Fringe Festival.

Her full-length original plays include:

 The Burning Season
Slip/Shot  
Bottle Fly 
 Babel  
 Arsonist, 
 The Terrible Girls, 
 Click  
 Skin & Bone  
 Backwards Forwards Back 
Her full-length adaptations include:
A Wind in the Door 
The Little Mermaid 
Little Women 
A Christmas Carol 

Her libretti include:

A Bright Mornin Dawns (choral): Composer Dominick DiOrio
Twa (opera): Composer Justine F. Chen 
Alice Tierney (opera): Composer Melissa Dunphy 
Ascension (short opera): Composer Melissa Dunphy 
Halcyon Days (choral): Composer Melissa Dunphy, 2021
Letter to Our Children (short opera): Composer Justine F. Chen, 2021
Set Myself Free (choral): Composer Melissa Dunphy, 2019

Her works have been developed and produced nationally  and internationally, including with the John F. Kennedy Center for the Performing Arts, BBC 3 Radio (UK), Perseverance Theatre, Hangar Theatre, Contemporary American Theatre Festival, Voces8 (UK), Disquiet (Portugal), Gate Theatre (New Zealand), New Georges, Oberlin Opera, St. Martin in the Fields (UK), McCarter Theatre, Hangar Theatre, Theatre Exile, Unicorn Theatre, Resonance Works, Capitol Stage, Azuka Theatre, Wilma Theatre, Arden Theatre, The National Theater (UK), Philadelphia Theatre Company, People's Light and Theatre Company, Amuse Singers, Vortex Rep, Women's Theatre Festival, NYC International Fringe, and others.

Goldfinger has also written short plays and monologues.

Goldfinger's work has been supported by Yaddo, Opera America, National Endowment for the Arts, Millay Colony, The Orchard Project, The Lark's Playwrights Week, New Georges’ Audrey Residency, Drama League's First Stage Residency, Granada Artist Residency at UC Davis, Emerson Stage's Playwright Residency, Playwrights Collective at Florida Studio Theatre, Sewanee Writers Conference Dakin and Williams Fellowships, Mid Atlantic Arts Foundation, Independence Foundation Fellowship in the Arts, among others.

Major creative publications 

 Halcyon Days (choral): “A beautifully concordant and consoling prayer.” -Opera Today
 Bottle Fly (play): “Jacqueline Goldfinger is that rarity in American theatre--a poet-playwright. Bottle Fly is a gorgeous play, roaring with the sacred and the profane and--for all its passion--delicately conveyed.”—Dan O’Brien, playwright, The Body of an American and The House in Scarsdale, Guggenheim Fellow in Drama & Performance Art (USA)
 The Arsonists (play): "Jacqueline Goldfinger’s spellbinding new play...The Arsonists, put me in mind of a kind of gender-reversed Sam Shepard—especially Shepard’s early collaborative work with Patti Smith...As in Shepard, there is a sense that love, loss, and betrayal are inseparable...What makes The Arsonists so extraordinary is in part its contradictory oddness. It’s realistic and gritty, but also beautifully poetic; epic in scale, but it runs only 70 minutes. There’s very little plot, but every line tells a story. By the time we reach the finale, the tone has shifted considerably. There is a sense here that the playwright honors a history of theater (the Greeks, Shepard, also Eugene O’Neill’s Mourning Becomes Electra), but it’s also contemporary. Best of all, Goldfinger’s voice is distinctly, wonderfully her own." -Philadelphia Magazine
 The Terrible Girls (play): “3 Women comes to mind…Sharp comic timing brings a vital levity to the cutting plot twists and nightmarish revelations. It’s an interesting examination of need for authority, whether real or imagined, that keeps us in the most precarious situations. Emotional needs beat logic to the truth in this pressure-cooker drama.” -CityPaper

Major academic publications 

 She is the Guest Editor of the Spring Issue of the Journal of American Drama and Theatre, with the theme of "Revolutions in New Work Development"
 In August 2022, she published her second academic book, co-authored with Allison Horsley, Writing Adaptations and Translations for the Stage, "This book gives you courage to start writing and keep writing. It looks at adaptations from all angles, while prompting and nurturing your own unique approach. It's for the novice, the experienced, the student, the professor, and everyone in between." Elena Araoz, Director, Producing Artistic Director of Theater and Music Theater at Princeton University
 In August 2021, she published her first academic book, Playwriting with Purpose: A Guide and Workbook for New Playwrights. "I wish I had this book when I began my writing journey. It's fresh, funny, thought-provoking, and provides important insights into the industry so that playwrights can get their work on stage immediately." -Antoinette Nwandu, Award-Winning Playwright and Screenwriter, Pass Over (Broadway), She's Gotta Have It (Netflix)
 Goldfinger has contributed to the Journal of Dramatic Theory and Criticism, August Wilson Journal, and TCG's Audience Revolutions essay series, among others.

Teaching and mentoring 
Goldfinger co-founded The Foundry with playwrights Michael Hollinger and Quinn Eli in 2012. The programme provides a free three-year mentorship and professional development program for emerging playwrights in Philadelphia. It continues as part of the PlayPenn New Play Conference Education Department. She has also taught playwriting workshops in the United States and internationally, including University of Pennsylvania (undergrad), University of California, Davis (graduate) and Disquiet Literary Conference, Portugal (adults).

References 

American dramatists and playwrights
Year of birth missing (living people)
Living people